Thomas Green, DD, was an academic in the sixteenth century.

Green was born in Cockermouth. A fellow of Jesus College, Cambridge he was Master of St Catharine's, from 1507 to 1529; and Vice Chancellor of the University of Cambridge from 1523 to 1524.

References

Fellows of St Catharine's College, Cambridge
Masters of St Catharine's College, Cambridge
People from Cockermouth